Earl Waldemar Heiskala (born November 30, 1942 in Kirkland Lake, Ontario) is a retired professional ice hockey player. He now lives in Imperial Beach, CA. He played in the NHL with the Philadelphia Flyers and also played in the WHA with the Los Angeles Sharks.

External links
 

1942 births
Living people
Canadian ice hockey left wingers
Canadian people of Finnish descent
Cincinnati Wings players
Greensboro Generals (SHL) players
Hamilton Red Wings (OHA) players
Ice hockey people from Ontario
Los Angeles Sharks players
Philadelphia Flyers players
Quebec Aces (AHL) players
San Diego Gulls (WHL) players
Seattle Totems (WHL) players
Sportspeople from Kirkland Lake